Charles Pineton de Chambrun (10 February 1875 in Washington – 6 November 1952) was a French diplomat and writer.

Biography 
He was the son of a judicial counsellor to the French ambassador to the United States. Charles served as attaché to France's ambassador to the Vatican, Berlin, then Washington.

In 1914, he became First Secretary at the St Petersburg embassy, and later served in Athens and Vienna. From 1928 to 1933, he represented France in Ankara and then became ambassador to Rome from 1933 to 1935.

In Rome he married Marie de Rohan-Chabot (1876–1951), daughter of the Duke and the Duchess of Rohan and widow of prince Lucien Murat. She was a writer, galleriste and landscape and portrait painter.

With Paul Claudel, Maurice Garçon, Marcel Pagnol, Jules Romains and Henri Mondor, he was one of six people elected on 4 April 1946 to the Académie française in the second group election to fill the numerous empty seats caused by the lack of elections during the German occupation of France.

Chambrun was a Grand officer of the Légion d'Honneur.

Works 
Charles de Chambrun
 Lettres à Marie, Pétersbourg-Pétrograd, 1914–1918 (1941)
 Atatürk et la Turquie nouvelle (1939)
 À l'école d'un diplomate : Vergennes (1944)
 L'Esprit de la diplomatie (1944)
 Traditions et souvenirs (1952)
Marie de Rohan Chabot (under the name Marie de Chambrun)
 Le Roi de Rome, Plon, 1941
Marie de Rohan Chabot (under the name Princesse Lucien Murat)
 Raspoutine et l'aube sanglante, De Boccard, s.d.
 La reine Christine de Suède, Flammarion, 1934
 Les Errants de la Gloire, Flammarion, 1933
 La vie amoureuse de la Grande Catherine coll. « Leurs amours », Flammarion, 1927

References

External links 
 Académie Française

1875 births
1952 deaths
20th-century French diplomats
20th-century French non-fiction writers
20th-century French male writers
Grand Officiers of the Légion d'honneur
Ambassadors of France to Greece
Ambassadors of France to Turkey
Ambassadors of France to Italy
French expatriates in the United States